"Parklife" is the title track from English rock band Blur's third studio album, Parklife (1994). When released as the album's third single in August 1994, it reached No. 10 on the UK Singles Chart and No. 30 in Ireland. The song contains elements of spoken word in the verses, narrated by actor Phil Daniels, who also appears in the song's music video. The choruses are sung by lead singer Damon Albarn.

The song won British Single of the Year and British Video of the Year at the 1995 Brit Awards and was also performed at the 2012 Brit Awards. The Massed Bands of the Household Division performed "Parklife" at the London 2012 Olympics closing ceremony. The song is one of the defining tracks of Britpop, and features on the 2003 compilation album Live Forever: The Rise and Fall of Brit Pop.

Background

According to Coxon the song was sarcastic, rather than a celebration of Englishness. He explained the song "wasn't about the working class, it was about the park class: dustbin men, pigeons, joggers – things we saw every day on the way to the studio [Maison Rouge in Fulham]" and that it was about "having fun and doing exactly what you want to do".

Daniels had been approached to recite a poem for "The Debt Collector", but Albarn could not find a poem he liked and made the song into an instrumental. Daniels was asked to sing lead vocals on "Parklife" instead. Daniels reinvigorated the band, who had grown tired of working on the track. Daniels was unfamiliar with the band, but after talking to Albarn, he accepted the job. The recording in the studio took about forty minutes. Daniels opted for a cut of the royalties rather than being paid up front.

Despite what is commonly believed, the song does not refer to Castle Park in Colchester, the town where the band hail from. According to Damon Albarn when introducing the song during their July 2009 Hyde Park performance, "I came up with the idea for this song in this park. I was living on Kensington Church Street, and I used to come into the park at the other end, and I used to, you know, watch people, and pigeons...", at which moment Phil Daniels appears onstage. Daniels also performed a rendition of the song at the band's headline slot at Glastonbury Festival 2009 and at the band's second Hyde Park concert in August 2012, and at the 2012 Brit Awards.

A number of newspaper articles about the young middle classes' adoption of Estuary English appeared during the single's chart run, including one in The Sunday Times on the day the song entered the singles chart (although Daniels' accent is more obviously cockney).

The song played a part in Blur's supposed feud with fellow Britpop band Oasis at the 1996 Brit Awards when the Gallagher brothers, Liam and Noel, taunted Blur by singing a drunk rendition of "Parklife", mimicking Albarn's accent (with Liam changing the lyrics to "Shite-life" and Noel shouting "Marmite"), when the members of Oasis were collecting the "Best British Album" award, which both bands had been nominated for.

Music video
The song's music video (directed by Pedro Romhanyi) filmed next to The Pilot pub on the Greenwich Peninsula features Phil Daniels as a smarmy double glazing salesman (a homage to Tin Men), with Albarn as his assistant. Other band members appear as various characters from the song, including Dave Rowntree and Alex James as a couple, with the latter in drag.  At one point, Albarn is impressed to see a man (Graham Coxon) carrying a placard reading "Modern Life Is Rubbish", the title of Blur's previous album; on the reverse is written "End of a Century", the title of their subsequent single from Parklife.

The car used by Daniels and Albarn is a bronze-coloured Ford Granada Coupe Mk1. In the video, the Granada pulls up next to an Audi Cabriolet convertible and Daniels says "It's got nothing to do with your 'Vorsprung durch Technik' yer know". The driver, played by Alex James, grimaces back at him. Both cars then pull away at speed to reveal 'Parklife' written on the tarmac.

The video was featured in the 1995 episode "Lightning Strikes" (episode 21 of Season 5) of Beavis and Butt-Head. The characters stated Daniels bore a resemblance to Family Feud host Richard Dawson.

Advertisement
The song started to be played at football matches in the mid-1990s, later becoming a "football anthem" and featuring on albums like The Best Footie Anthems in the World...Ever! and The Beautiful Game, the Official Album of Euro 1996.

Nike aired a television advertisement in 1997 called Parklife. The advertisement featured the song and Premier League footballers including Eric Cantona, Ian Wright and Robbie Fowler.  The advert received acclaim and later was rated the 14th best advert of all time by ITV in 2005, and as the 15th best by Channel 4 in 2000.

The song is played before the home matches of Chelsea F.C. at Stamford Bridge. The song's narrator Phil Daniels and Blur frontman Damon Albarn are both fans of Chelsea.

This song is also sung at Carrow Road, the home of Norwich City F.C., with the words "All the Germans, so many Germans, and they all go hand in hand, hand in hand through their Farkelife... FARKELIFE!" This is due to the fact that manager Daniel Farke bought so many German players.

Reception
Larry Flick of Billboard wrote, "Blur continues to explore its newfound interest in shameless pop, first exploited on the giddy, 'New-Romantic'-sounding "Girls & Boys". This follow-up is pure fun, as the British act pounces through bouncy melodies, woven through playful guitars and spoken-word vocals." Chuck Campbell from Knoxville News Sentinel viewed it as a "good song" and "wry British pop", remarking that it features "a chatty performance" by actor Phil Daniels. Pan-European magazine Music & Media commented, "Old men on the park bench will have to move over a little bit to make room for these punky brats commenting on life around the pool. It's as nurturing for the ducks as it is for you." Mark Sutherland awarded the song "Best New Single" in the 17 August issue of Smash Hits, calling it "superb," and "one of the barmiest pop songs ever." In May 2007, NME magazine placed "Parklife" at number 41 in its list of the 50 Greatest Indie Anthems Ever.

"Parklife" is the best-selling single from the album, with 190,000 copies sold.

The Kinks' Ray Davies spoke glowingly of the song, calling it "maybe their best song, and certainly their best record" and stating, "One of my fondest times with Damon is a poetry festival at the Albert Hall. He sang one of my songs and I sang 'Parklife'. Then I understood the similarities between The Kinks and Blur. It's in the way I change chords, and sing stylistically."

Track listings
All music composed by Albarn, Coxon, James and Rowntree. All lyrics composed by Albarn.

CD1 CD1 / Cassette
 "Parklife" – 3:06
 "Supa Shoppa" – 3:02
 "Theme from an Imaginary Film" – 3:34

CD2
 "Parklife" – 3:06
 "Beard" – 1:45
 "To the End" (French Version) – 4:06

7-inch (jukebox)
 "Parklife" – 3:06
 "Supa Shoppa" – 3:02
 Pressed for use on jukeboxes; not issued commercially

12-inch
 "Parklife" – 3:06
 "Supa Shoppa" – 3:02
 "To the End" (French Version) – 4:06
 "Beard" – 1:45

2012 Brit Awards
"Girls & Boys" (Live from the BRITs) - 4:43
"Song 2" (Live from the BRITs) - 2:15
"Parklife" (featuring Phil Daniels) (Live from the BRITs) - 2:52

B-sides
Blur provided the single with a selection of strikingly contrasting B-sides, all pastiches of other genres of music. One of a number of occasional Blur songs written in waltz time and built on an arrangement of harpsichord, piano and string synths, Theme from an Imaginary Film was planned but rejected for the film Decadence. Supa Shoppa was an instrumental in the style of acid jazz, recorded with percussion, synth flute and Hammond organ parts. Drowned in Sound, reviewing Blur's career, noted that it had been a "perfect live opener for the Parklife tour when cranked up." Beard also parodied jazz music, and was named based on the stereotype of jazz fans wearing them. An additional alternative version of To the End was also added. (At the time, to boost singles' chart placings it was customary for bands to release singles in several formats with exclusive tracks to encourage fans to buy them all.)

Personnel
 Damon Albarn – lead vocals, piano, Hammond organ
 Phil Daniels – narration
 Graham Coxon – electric guitars, alto saxophone, backing vocals
 Alex James – bass guitar
 Dave Rowntree – drums
 Simon Clarke – baritone saxophone

Charts

Certifications

References

External links
 

1994 singles
1994 songs
Brit Award for British Single
Blur (band) songs
Food Records singles
Music videos directed by Pedro Romhanyi
Song recordings produced by Stephen Street
Songs written by Alex James (musician)
Songs written by Damon Albarn
Songs written by Dave Rowntree
Songs written by Graham Coxon